The Dreros inscription is the earliest surviving inscribed law from ancient Greece.  It was discovered in Dreros, an ancient settlement on the island of Crete, in 1936, and first published by Pierre Demargne and Henri van Effenterre in 1937.

In 1936, thirteen stones inscribed with archaic letters were discovered in a Hellenistic cistern in Dreros.  These stones apparently came from the east wall of the temple of Apollo Delphinios, and make up eight inscriptions or fragments of inscriptions.  This display of laws in public, often in sanctuaries, is a frequent feature of archaic Cretan law.  The Dreros inscription is the longest of these eight laws.

The Dreros law is inscribed on a block of grey schist, which measures 1.74m x 0.25m x 0.35m.  The block is inscribed with large, irregular letters (from 0.02 to 0.05m high).  L.H. Jeffery describes the lettering as "tall, thin, and straggling", and notes that it resembles the lettering on the Dedication of Nikandre.  There are four full lines of text; in addition, between the first and second line there is a word inscribed in smaller letters.  The first three full lines are written in boustrophedon  fashion – i.e. alternating between right-left and left-right.  The fourth line begins a new clause, and again begins from the right – this is the first known example of this system of paragraphing in a Greek text.

The text dates to the second half of the seventh century BC, and is the oldest surviving Greek law.  The law begins with an invocation to a god.  It rules that anyone who holds the office of kosmos cannot hold it again for ten years after their term of office ends, and says that anyone who breaks the law is to be fined and deprived of civic rights.  The final clause of the law lists the kosmos, daimoi, and the Twenty of the Polis as taking an oath to confirm the law.  This restriction on holding the office of kosmos is paralleled in an inscription from Gortyn, though there the restriction on holding the office was only to once every three years.

References

Works cited
 
 
 
 
 
 
 

Ancient Greek law
Ancient Crete
Archaic Greece
Greek inscriptions